The Greenhow and Rumsey Store Building, on Main Ave. in Ketchum, Idaho is a historic building dating from 1884.  It is listed on the National Register of Historic Places (NRHP).

Also known as the Golden Rule Store, it includes Romanesque Revival influence in its architecture. It was a department store in C.C. Anderson's Idaho chain of Golden Rule Store brand stores.

The building was listed on the National Register of Historic Places in 1983.

References 

Commercial buildings on the National Register of Historic Places in Idaho
Romanesque Revival architecture in Idaho
Commercial buildings completed in 1884
Buildings and structures in Blaine County, Idaho
Department stores on the National Register of Historic Places
National Register of Historic Places in Blaine County, Idaho